

Allele distribution

Haplotypes
For A29-Cw*16-B44 (A*2902:Cw*1601:B*4403) haplotype see Cw*16

References

2